Vernon McArley (29 September 1923 – 4 July 2019) was a New Zealand cricketer. He played six first-class matches for Otago between 1947 and 1958.

See also
 List of Otago representative cricketers

References

External links
 

1923 births
2019 deaths
New Zealand cricketers
Otago cricketers
Cricketers from Dunedin